Balala the Fairies: the Movie is a 2013 Chinese adventure film produced by Guangdong Alpha Animation and Culture Co., Ltd. It is a live-action film adaptation of Balala the Fairies, an animated magical girl series of the same name created by Guangzhou toy company Alpha Group Co., Ltd. It was followed by 2014's Balala the Fairies: The Magic Trial and 2015's Balala the Fairies: Princess Camellia.

Plot 
At stargazing camp with friends, sisters Michelle (美雪, Meixue) and Maggie (美琪, Meiqi) saw meteorites crashing on to Earth. When the two sisters went to check it out, they found a strange but pretty looking stone and a badly wounded bird. They took the bird home to look after it and ended up finding Shirley (小蓝, Xiaolan), back from Fairy Castle. They must complete a new mission: to retrieve the Star Key.

References

Chinese adventure films
2010s adventure films
Magical girl films
Live-action films based on animated series